Yen Lu may refer to:

 Yan Wuyou, also known as Yan Lu/Yen Lu
 Lu Yen, Taiwanese composer